The term marriage squeeze refers to an imbalance between the number of men and women available to marry in a certain society. The term was originally coined to illustrate the different patterns of marriage of men and women in 1960s United States, where a striking divergence of ethnic differences in marriage has persisted into the 21st century: compared to white and Hispanic women, black women marry later in life, are less likely to marry at all, and have higher rates of marital instability. Much attention has focused on the role of racial intermarriage. According to data from dating services, African American women are the least likely to receive response from men of any race and ethnicity in the United States. Census data from 2010 indicate that in the United States 24% of male Black newlyweds marry outside of their race, compared to 9% of female Black newlyweds. A similar (albeit less pronounced) asymmetry exists in the United Kingdom. A contrasting gender imbalance exists for Asian Americans, among whom females are twice as likely to marry outside their race than males.

In China and India there are more men than women of marriageable age. Age is a factor of special relevance in China’s male marriage squeeze, where a strict one-child policy—which had been introduced in 1979 with the intention to lower birth rates—entrenched a strong cultural preference for sons which is likely the cause of excess female child mortality and a higher than normal sex ratio at birth.

Causes of the African-American marriage squeeze

There have been a variety of suggestions to explain the patterns of marriage observed. These explanations should take account of wider trends in family structure.

Economic disadvantage
From the 1960s onward, first marital stability and later marriage formation became more strongly linked to the transition into stable employment for both men and women. African Americans have suffered disproportionate economic disadvantage, in large part due to the legacy of legal discrimination, which increasingly became an obstacle to marriage. The result has been racial inequalities in marital status in all education groups.

Incarceration
As a category, African American men suffer from higher rates of incarceration, unemployment, and poor health than do their white counterparts in the United States. These conditions often make their lives unstable, and disqualify them from raising a home effectively, in effect branding them as "unmarriageable". Rates of incarceration for marriage-age African American males are far higher than rates for females, further contributing to the male–female gap. As of 2002, 10.4% of all African American males between the ages of 25 and 29 were sentenced and in prison. The African-American male–female disparity is highest between the ages of 25 and 29, when for every two African-American men, there are nearly three African-American women.

Desire to "marry up"

There is a desire among educated women of all races to marry partners within or above their social and economic class; when African American women restrict their marriage prospects to African American men, African American women risk either marrying below their socioeconomic class or not marrying at all, as African American women consistently achieve better completion rates in higher education than African American men do.

See also
Physical attractiveness
Human mating strategies
Sexual selection in humans

References

Black studies
Marriage in the United States